Robert Howard (born 1 March 2002) is an American freestyle and folkstyle wrestler who competes collegiately at 125 pounds. In freestyle, he claimed the 2018 Youth Summer Olympic gold medal and is a three–time US Cadet World Team Member. In college, Howard is a sophomore at 125 pounds for the Penn State Nittany Lions.

Folkstyle career

High school 
Howard, a native from Cranford, New Jersey, competed in high school wrestling out of Bergen Catholic High School, where he was the team captain and a four–time letterman. He went on to compile 133 victories to 10 defeats, claimed two NJSIAA state titles while making the finals four times and led the team to three team state championships before graduating.

College 
A high school junior, Howard committed to Cael Sanderson and the Penn State Nittany Lions to attend the Pennsylvania State University.

2020–2021 
As a freshman, Howard did not find much success and went 7–6 overall and 2–2 at the NCAAs, with the biggest win being Ohio State's Malik Heinselman.

2021–2022 
Howard redshirted his next season.

Freestyle career

Age–group level 
As a cadet, Howard claimed the 2018 Youth Summer Olympic gold medal at 55 kilograms for the United States of America. He also made three US Cadet World Teams from 2017 to 2019, placing 13th, 9th and 5th at the Cadet World Championships.

NCAA record 

! colspan="8"| NCAA Division I Record
|-
!  Res.
!  Record
!  Opponent
!  Score
!  Date
!  Event
|-
! style=background:lighgrey colspan=6 |Start of 2022–2023 Season (sophomore year)
|-
! style=background:lighgrey colspan=6 |End of 2020–2021 Season (freshman year)
|-
! style=background:white colspan=6 | 2021 NCAA Championships DNP at 125 lbs
|-
|Loss
|7–6
|align=left| Patrick McKee
|style="font-size:88%"|Fall
|style="font-size:88%" rowspan=4|March 18–20, 2021
|style="font-size:88%" rowspan=4|2021 NCAA Division I National Championships
|-
|Win
|7–5
|align=left| Fabian Gutierrez
|style="font-size:88%"|9–7
|-
|Loss
|6–5
|align=left| Taylor Lamont
|style="font-size:88%"|1–2
|-
|Win
|6–4
|align=left| Malik Heinselman
|style="font-size:88%"|6–4
|-
! style=background:white colspan=6 | 2021 Big Ten Conference 6th at 125 lbs
|-
|Loss
|5–4
|align=left| Michael DeAugustino
|style="font-size:88%"|2–4
|style="font-size:88%" rowspan=6|March 6–7, 2021
|style="font-size:88%" rowspan=6|2021 Big Ten Conference Championships
|-
|Loss
|5–3
|align=left| Malik Heinselman
|style="font-size:88%"|2–5
|-
|Win
|5–2
|align=left| Dylan Ragusin
|style="font-size:88%"|SV–1 3–1
|-
|Win
|4–2
|align=left| Dylan Shawver
|style="font-size:88%"|MD 10–1
|-
|Win
|3–2
|align=left| Zach Spence
|style="font-size:88%"|MD 16–4
|-
|Loss
|2–2
|align=left| Eric Barnett
|style="font-size:88%"|2–3
|-
|Win
|2–1
|align=left| Zach Spence
|style="font-size:88%"|10–4
|style="font-size:88%"|February 21, 2021
|style="font-size:88%"|Maryland - Penn State Dual
|-
|Loss
|1–1
|align=left| Malik Heinselman
|style="font-size:88%"|2–5
|style="font-size:88%"|February 19, 2021
|style="font-size:88%"|Penn State - Ohio State Dual
|-
|Win
|1–0
|align=left| Jack Medley
|style="font-size:88%"|6–5
|style="font-size:88%"|February 14, 2021
|style="font-size:88%"|Penn State - Michigan Dual
|-
! style=background:lighgrey colspan=6 |Start of 2020-2021 Season (freshman year)

Stats 

!  Season
!  Year
!  School
!  Rank
!  Weigh Class
!  Record
!  Win
!  Bonus
|-
|2021
|Freshman
||Penn State University
|#23
|125
|7–6
|53.85%
|23.08%
|-
|colspan=5 bgcolor="LIGHTGREY"|Career
|bgcolor="LIGHTGREY"|7–6
|bgcolor="LIGHTGREY"|53.85%
|bgcolor="LIGHTGREY"|23.08%

References 

2002 births
American male sport wrestlers
Wrestlers at the 2018 Summer Youth Olympics
Youth Olympic gold medalists for the United States
Penn State Nittany Lions wrestlers
Living people
Bergen Catholic High School alumni
People from Cranford, New Jersey
Sportspeople from Union County, New Jersey